SS Roma was an ocean liner built for the Italian shipping company Navigazione Generale Italiana of Genoa by Ansaldo shipyard in Sestri Ponente. She was the sister ship to MS Augustus. The ship was later transferred to the new Italian Line after the merger of Navigazione Generale Italiana. When Second World War broke out, she was acquired by the Navy for Conversion to aircraft carrier name Aquila. She was taken over by the German occupation forces in 1943 but was partially scuttled by Italians. She was raised and scrapped in 1951.

History

Ocean Liner Career
Following the end of World War I, many shipping companies were waiting to have enough money to build new liners. Navigazione Generale Italiana ordered two new 30,000 gross register tons transatlantic ocean liners from Ansaldo shipyard. The first ship was launched in 1926 and christened Roma. She had an entirely steel hull. Her interior was decorated in Baroque style.

Unlike Romas sister ship , Roma was powered by eight turbines connected in couples to four shafts. Some of the machinery was sourced from the canceled Italian Navy  Cristoforo Columbo. Roma could carry 1700 passengers (375 first, 300 second, 300 intermediate, 700 third class).

Her two funnels were repainted into the Italian Line's colors after her  company merged  with Lloyd Sabaudo and Cosulich Line to form the new  Italian Line. In 1933 the intermediate class was replaced by the touristic one. The main deck was covered with teak.

On 30 January 1932, Roma rammed the American ocean liner  at New York, severely damaging President Roosevelt. President Roosevelt was repaired and returned to service. The Roma will continue passenger service until 1939.

Conversion to aircraft carrier

When World War II broke out, she was laid up and later taken over by the Italian Navy. She was then refitted and transformed into an aircraft carrier named Aquila. Her speed was increased to 30 knots after the refitting. She was taken over by the German occupation forces in 1943  but was partially scuttled by Italian co-belligerents two years later. After the end of the conflict, her wreckage was raised and towed to La Spezia, where she was scrapped in 1951–1952.

See also
MS Augustus
Italian aircraft carrier Aquila

References

Bibliography
 

Passenger ships of Italy
Ocean liners
1926 ships
Ships built in Genoa
Ships built by Gio. Ansaldo & C.
Maritime incidents in 1932